School District 100 may refer to:
 Belvidere School District 100
 Jersey Community Unit School District No. 100
 South Berwyn School District 100